Fatal Attraction is a 1987 American psychological thriller film directed by Adrian Lyne from a screenplay by James Dearden, based on his 1980 short film Diversion. Starring Michael Douglas, Glenn Close, and Anne Archer, the film centers on a married man who has a weekend affair with a woman who refuses to allow it to end and becomes obsessed with him.

Fatal Attraction was released on September 18, 1987, by Paramount Pictures. It received positive reviews from critics, but generated controversy at the time of its release. The film became a huge box office success, grossing $320 million against a $14 million budget, becoming the highest-grossing film of 1987 worldwide. At the 60th Academy Awards, it received six nominations: Best Picture, Best Director, Best Actress (for Close), Best Supporting Actress (for Archer), Best Adapted Screenplay, and Best Film Editing.

Plot 
Daniel "Dan" Gallagher is a successful and happily married lawyer from Manhattan. His work leads him to meet Alexandra "Alex" Forrest, an editor for a publishing company. While his wife, Beth, and daughter, Ellen, are out of town for the weekend, Dan has an affair with Alex. Initially, both of them understood it to be just a fling, but Alex begins to cling to him.

After leaving abruptly in the middle of the night, Dan reluctantly spends the following day with Alex at her request. When he tries to leave again, she manipulatively cuts her wrists to force him to stay. Dan helps her bandage the cuts, stays with her overnight to ensure she is all right, and leaves in the morning. Although Dan thinks the affair is forgotten, Alex shows up at his office to apologize for her behavior and invites him to a performance of Madame Butterfly. He declines politely. Alex continues to call him at his office until he informs his secretary that he will no longer take her calls.

Alex starts calling Dan's home at all hours, claiming that she is pregnant and intends to keep the baby. Despite Dan's desire to have nothing to do with her, she argues that he must take responsibility. After he changes his home phone number, Alex shows up at his apartment, which is for sale, and meets Beth while feigning interest as a buyer. Later that night, Dan goes to Alex's apartment to confront her, and they get into a scuffle. In response, she says, "I will not be ignored."

Dan relocates his family to Bedford, but this does not dissuade Alex. She has a tape recording of herself delivered to him, which is full of verbal abuse. She stalks him in a parking garage, pours acid on his car, damaging the engine, and follows him home one night, spying on him, Beth, and Ellen from the bushes in their yard. The sight of the family makes her sick to her stomach. Her obsession escalates when Dan approaches the police to apply for a restraining order against Alex, claiming it is "for a client." The lieutenant informs Dan that he cannot violate Alex's rights without probable cause, and that the "client" must own up to his adultery.

At one point, when the Gallaghers are away, Alex kills Ellen's pet rabbit and puts it on their stove to boil. Beth discovers the pot and screams in terror. Following this, Dan confesses the affair and Alex's alleged pregnancy to Beth. Enraged, she orders Dan to leave. Before he departs, Dan calls Alex to inform her that Beth knows about the affair. Beth takes the phone and threatens Alex, saying she will kill her if she persists. Without Dan and Beth's knowledge, Alex picks up Ellen from school and takes her to an amusement park. Beth becomes terrified when she cannot locate Ellen and drives around frantically looking for her. In the process, she rear-ends a car stopped at an intersection, injuring herself and requiring hospitalization. Alex returns Ellen home unharmed, asking for a kiss on the cheek.

Dan forcibly enters Alex's apartment and attempts to strangle her, but stops short of killing her. As he releases her, she grabs a kitchen knife and lunges at him, but he disarms her and departs as she watches with a smile. The police search for Alex after Dan reports the kidnapping. Beth forgives Dan after her release from the hospital, and they return home.

One day, while Beth is taking a bath, Alex suddenly appears with the knife and explains her belief that Beth is obstructing her from having Dan. She attacks Beth, and Dan rushes in to wrestle her into the bathtub, where he appears to drown her. But Alex suddenly emerges from the water, brandishing the knife. Beth then shoots and kills Alex with Dan's revolver. The final scene depicts police cars outside the Gallaghers' house. Dan completes his statement to the police and joins Beth in the living room, with a picture of their family in the foreground.

Cast 

 Michael Douglas as Dan Gallagher, husband of Beth, father of Ellen, and a New York City lawyer that has an affair with Alex Forrest and later regrets doing this.
 Glenn Close as Alex Forrest, who becomes obsessed with Dan after a very brief affair.
 Anne Archer as Beth Rogerson Gallagher
 Ellen Hamilton Latzen as Ellen Gallagher
 Stuart Pankin as Jimmy
 Ellen Foley as Hildy
 Fred Gwynne as Arthur, Dan's boss
 Meg Mundy as Joan Rogerson, Beth's mother
 Tom Brennan as Howard Rogerson, Beth's father
 Lois Smith as Martha, Dan's secretary
 Mike Nussbaum as Bob Drimmer
 J. J. Johnston as O'Rourke
 Michael Arkin as Lieutenant
 Jane Krakowski as Christine, the babysitter

Production

Writing 
The film was adapted by James Dearden (with assistance from Nicholas Meyer) from Diversion, an earlier 1980 short film by Dearden for British television. In Meyer's book The View from the Bridge: Memories of Star Trek and a Life in Hollywood, he explains that in late 1986 producer Stanley R. Jaffe asked him to look at the script developed by Dearden, and he wrote a four-page memo making suggestions, including a new ending. A few weeks later Meyer met with director Adrian Lyne and gave him some additional suggestions. Ultimately Meyer was asked to redraft the script on the basis of his suggestions, which ended up being the shooting script.

Casting 
Producers Sherry Lansing and Stanley R. Jaffe both had serious doubts about casting Glenn Close because they did not think she could be sexual enough for the role of Alex. Barbara Hershey was originally considered for the role. Several actresses auditioned for the part, but they were almost all turned down. Close was persistent, and after meeting with Jaffe several times in New York, she was asked to fly out to Los Angeles to read with Michael Douglas in front of Adrian Lyne and Lansing. Before the audition, she let her naturally frizzy hair "go wild" because she was impatient at putting it up, and she wore a slimming black dress she thought made her look "fabulous" to the audition. This impressed Lansing, because Close "came in looking completely different... right away she was into the part." Close and Douglas performed a scene from early in the script, where Alex flirts with Dan in a café, and Close came away "convinced my career was over, that I was finished, I had completely blown my chances." Lansing and Lyne, however, were both convinced that she was right for the role; Lyne stated that "an extraordinary erotic transformation took place. She was this tragic, bewildering mix of sexuality and rage—I watched Alex come to life."

To prepare for her role, Close consulted several psychologists, hoping to understand Alex's psyche and motivations. She was uncomfortable with the bunny boiling scene, which she thought was too extreme, but she was assured on consulting the psychologists that such an action was entirely possible and that Alex's behavior corresponded to someone who had experienced incestual sexual abuse as a child.

Alternate ending 
Alex Forrest was originally scripted slashing her throat at the film's end with the knife Dan had left on the counter, so as to make it appear that Dan had murdered her. After seeing her husband being taken away by police, Beth finds a revealing cassette tape that Alex sent Dan in which she threatens to kill herself. Upon realizing Alex's intentions, Beth takes the tape to the police, who clear Dan of the murder. The last scene shows, in flashback, Alex taking her own life by slashing her throat while listening to Madame Butterfly.

After doing test screenings, Joseph Farrell (who handled the test screenings) suggested that Paramount shoot a new ending.

In the 2002 Special Edition DVD, Close comments that she had doubts about re-shooting the film's ending because she believed the character would "self-destruct and commit suicide". Close eventually gave in on her concerns, and filmed the new sequence after having fought against the change for two weeks. Close has described how protective she was of her character, whom she "never thought of as a villain", stating that: "I wasn't playing a generality, I wasn't playing a cliché. I was playing a very specific, deeply disturbed, fragile human being, whom I had grown to love." However, though the ending made Alex into a "psychopath" against Close's wishes, she has also acknowledged that the film would not have experienced the enormous success it did without the new ending, because it gave the audience "a sense of catharsis, a hope, that somehow the family unit would survive the nightmare."

The film's first Japanese release used the original ending. The original ending also appeared on a special edition VHS and LaserDisc release by Paramount in 1992, and was included on the film's DVD release a decade later.

Home media
A Special Collector's Edition of the film was released on DVD in 2002. Paramount released Fatal Attraction on Blu-ray Disc on June 9, 2009. The Blu-ray contained several bonus features from the 2002 DVD, including commentary by director Adrian Lyne, cast and crew interviews, a look at the film's cultural phenomenon, a behind-the-scenes look, rehearsal footage, the alternative ending, and the original theatrical trailer. In April 2020 a remastered Blu-ray Disc was released by Paramount Home Entertainment under their Paramount Presents series. Included was a new interview with the director titled Filmmaker Focus, previous rehearsal footage but excluding some of the extra features from previous releases. Paramount released the film on 4K Ultra HD Blu-ray in the U.S. on September 13, 2022.

Reception and legacy 
Fatal Attraction spent eight weeks at number 1 in the US where it was the second-highest-grossing film of 1987, behind Three Men and a Baby. In the UK it grossed a record £2,048,421 in its opening week and spent ten weeks at number one. In Australia, it was the first non-Australian film to gross A$2 million in its opening week, second to Crocodile Dundee. It grossed $320.1 million worldwide, making it the year's biggest film. This success led to similar psychological thrillers being made in the late 1980s and 1990s. Rotten Tomatoes gives the film a rating of 75% based on reviews from 55 critics, with an average rating of 6.80/10. The site's consensus reads, "A potboiler in the finest sense, Fatal Attraction is a sultry, juicy thriller that's hard to look away from once it gets going." On Metacritic, the film has a rating of 67/100 based on reviews from 16 critics. Audiences polled by CinemaScore gave the film an average grade of "A" on an A+ to F scale.

Time magazine film critic Richard Corliss said "[The film brings] horror home to a place where the grownup moviegoer actually lives." The New York Times’ Janet Maslin said the film would become a long-standing favorite with audiences, writing "Years hence, it will be possible to pinpoint the exact moment that produced Fatal Attraction, Adrian Lyne's new romantic thriller, and the precise circumstances that made it a hit." Fatal Attraction engendered discussion of the consequences of infidelity as some feminists did not appreciate the depiction of a strong career woman who is a psychopath.

Author Susan Faludi discussed the film in Backlash: The Undeclared War Against American Women, arguing that major changes had been made to the original plot in order to make Alex wholly negative, while Dan's carelessness and the lack of compassion and responsibility raised no discussion, except for a small number of men's groups who said that Dan was eventually forced to own up to his irresponsibility in that "everyone pays the piper". Close was quoted in 2008 as saying, "Men still come up to me and say, 'You scared the shit out of me.' Sometimes they say, 'You saved my marriage.'" Critic Barry Norman expressed sympathy for feminists who were frustrated by the film, criticized its "over-the-top" ending and called it inferior to Clint Eastwood's Play Misty for Me, which has a similar plot. Nonetheless, he declared it "strong and very well made, excellently played by the three main characters and neatly written". Fatal Attraction has been described as a neo-noir film by some authors.

Fatal Attraction was the first foreign film to be distributed by United International Pictures. In September 1988, Korean film distributors protested this release by "releasing snakes, setting fire in the theatres, and tearing off the screens."

Psychiatrists and film experts have analyzed the character of Alex Forrest and used her as an illustration of borderline personality disorder. She exhibits impulsive behavior, emotional instability, a fear of abandonment, frequent episodes of intense anger, self-harming, and shifting betweenidealization and devaluation of others, all of which are characteristic of the disorder. However, the degree to which she displays these traits is not necessarily typical, and aggression in individuals with borderline personality disorder is often directed towards themselves rather than others.

As referenced in Orit Kamir's Every Breath You Take: Stalking Narratives and the Law, "Glenn Close's character Alex is quite deliberately made to be an erotomaniac. Gelder reports that Close "consulted three separate shrinks for an inner profile of her character, who is meant to be suffering from a form of an obsessive condition known as de Clérambault's syndrome" (Gelder 1990, 93–94). The term "bunny boiler" is used to describe an obsessive, spurned woman, deriving from the scene where it is discovered that Alex has boiled the family's pet rabbit.

Accolades and honors 

American Film Institute recognition
 AFI's 100 Years...100 Thrills—#28
 AFI's 100 Years...100 Heroes & Villains: Alex Forrest—Villain—#7

Adaptations

Play 

A play based on the film opened in London's West End at the Theatre Royal Haymarket in March 2014. It was adapted by the film's original screenwriter James Dearden.

TV series 

On July 2, 2015, Fox announced that a TV series based on the film was being developed by Mad Men writers Maria and Andre Jacquemetton. On January 13, 2017, it was announced that the project was canceled.

On February 24, 2021, it was announced that Paramount+ planned to reboot the film as a series for their platform. It would be written by Alexandra Cunningham and Kevin J. Hynes and produced by Cunningham, Hynes, Justin Falvey and Darryl Frank of Amblin Entertainment, Stanley Jaffe, and Sherry Lansing. On November 11, Lizzy Caplan was announced to play Alex Forrest in the new series and Joshua Jackson joined as Dan Gallagher.

See also 
 Carolyn Warmus
 List of films featuring home invasions
 Mental illness in film
 Basic Instinct, a 1992 film exploring similar themes
 Fatal Instinct, a 1993 film parody

References

External links 

 
 
 
 
 
 
 

1987 films
1987 thriller films
1980s American films
1980s English-language films
1980s erotic thriller films
1980s pregnancy films
1980s psychological thriller films
American erotic thriller films
American pregnancy films
American psychological thriller films
American remakes of British films
Borderline personality disorder in fiction
Features based on short films
Films adapted into television shows
Films about adultery in the United States
Films about lawyers
Films about self-harm
Films about sexuality
Films about stalking
Films directed by Adrian Lyne
Films scored by Maurice Jarre
Films set in Manhattan
Films set in Westchester County, New York
Films shot in New York City
Home invasions in film
Paramount Pictures films